The men's 400 metres at the 2008 Summer Olympics took place on 18–21 August at the Beijing National Stadium. Fifty-five athletes from 40 nations competed.

The event was won by LaShawn Merritt of the United States, in what would ultimately be the final of seven consecutive American victories stretching from 1984 to 2008; it was the 19th overall title in the event by the United States. Jeremy Wariner took silver to become the fourth man to win two medals in the event, though Merritt kept him from matching Michael Johnson's pair of golds. David Neville's bronze completed the American podium sweep, the second consecutive sweep in the event and the fifth overall (1904, 1968, 1988, 2004).

Summary

The defending champion was Jeremy Wariner, who also won World Championship titles in 2005 and 2007 preceding the 2008 Olympics.  Wariner made headlines earlier in the season when he dropped long time coach Clyde Hart, in favor of Hart's assistant Michael Ford.  All season, Wariner did not show the dominance of the previous three seasons.  At the Olympic Trials he was runner up to LaShawn Merritt, the World Championship silver medalist.  The semi-finals showed the same two in the same position, Merritt .03 faster than Wariner.

Wariner started fast in the final: running in lane 7, he caught up with Martyn Rooney to his outside making up the stagger before the 200 mark.  Further outside but more difficult to calculate, David Neville was also out fast, while Merritt was even relative to the stagger against Chris Brown in lanes 4 and 5.  Around the final turn Merritt separated from the others and the three Americans were ahead, with Neville in first as the turn was ending.  Once they hit the straightaway, it was Merritt who had the speed, sprinting away with a high knee action that increased his gap over Wariner and Neville.  Wariner had no answer, Neville looked depleted, while Brown was steadily gaining.  Merritt sped away to a personal best 43.75, Wariner gave up the chase and jogged across the finish line in second, barely ahead of Brown, who looked like he had passed Neville.  In the last two steps, Neville leant forward and fell right at the finish line, his hands technically crossing the line ahead of Wariner.  But it is the torso that counts and Neville's body crossed the line in third, .04 ahead of Brown and .06 behind Wariner.  Merritt had gained just shy of a full second on Wariner over the last 90 metres for the win.  Neville completed an American sweep of the event.

Background

This was the 26th appearance of the event, which is one of 12 athletics events to have been held at every Summer Olympics. Four of the finalists from 2004 returned: gold medalist Jeremy Wariner of the United States, fourth-place finisher Alleyne Francique of Grenada, seventh-place finisher Leslie Djhone of France, and eight-place finisher Michael Blackwood of Jamaica. Wariner also won the 2005 and 2007 world championships, but teammate LaShawn Merritt (runner-up at the 2007 worlds) had beaten Wariner twice in 2008 (including the U.S. Olympic trials). The two were heavy favorites over a field without other significant challengers.

The People's Republic of China, the Czech Republic, São Tomé and Príncipe, and San Marino appeared in this event for the first time. The United States made its 25th appearance, most of any nation, having missed only the boycotted 1980 Games.

Qualification
Each National Olympic Committee (NOC) was able to enter up to three entrants providing they had met the A qualifying standard (45.55) in the qualifying period (1 January 2007 to 23 July 2008). NOCs were also permitted to enter one athlete providing he had met the B standard (45.95) in the same qualifying period.

Competition format

The competition used the three-round format introduced in 2004. The "fastest loser" system, introduced in 1964, was used for the first round and semifinals. There were 7 first-round heats, each with 8 runners (before a withdrawal reduced one heat to 7). The top three runners in each heat advanced, along with the next three fastest overall. The 24 semifinalists were divided into 3 heats of 8 runners each. The top two runners in each semifinal heat  and the next two fastest overall advanced, making an eight-man final.

Records
Prior to this competition, the existing world and Olympic records were as follows:

No new world or Olympic records were set for this event.

The following national records were established during the competition:

Schedule

Since 1984, all rounds have been held on separate days.

All times are China Standard Time (UTC+8)

Results

Round 1
The first round was held on 18 August. The first three runners of each heat (Q) plus the next three overall fastest runners (q) qualified for the semifinals.

Heat 1

Heat 2

Heat 3

Heat 4

Heat 5

Heat 6

Heat 7

Semifinals

The semifinals were held on 19 August 2008.

Semifinal 1

The first semifinal was held at 21:45.

Semifinal 2
 
The second semifinal was held at 21:52.

Semifinal 3

The third semifinal was held at 21:59.

Final

Wariner slowed after Merritt started pulling away from him in the final straight and it became clear that Wariner could not keep pace with Merritt. This resulted in Merritt winning by 0.99 seconds, officially the largest margin of victory in a 400 metres final since 1896 (1.0 seconds).

References

External links
Results

Athletics at the 2008 Summer Olympics
400 metres at the Olympics
Men's events at the 2008 Summer Olympics